Priacanthus meeki is a species of marine ray finned fish, a bigeye in the family Priacanthidae. It is a red fish found in the Hawaiian and Midway Islands. It grows to a size of 33 cm in length. Common names are Hawaiian bigeye in English and ula lau au in the Hawaiian language. It, and other species of its family, may also be called  āweoweo in Hawaii. 

Its specific name honours the American ichthyologist Seth Eugene Meek (1859-1914).

References

meeki
Fish of Hawaii
Taxa named by Oliver Peebles Jenkins
Fish described in 1903